Middendorf is a surname. Notable people with the surname include:

 J. William Middendorf, U.S. diplomat
 John Middendorf, big wall rock climber
 Tracy Middendorf, American television, movie, and stage actress
 Alexander von Middendorff, Russian zoologist and explorer of Baltic-German origin.

See also
Middendorf's, a restaurant in Louisiana, United States